The Jacksonville Jumbo Shrimp are a Minor League Baseball team of the International League (IL) and the Triple-A affiliate of the Miami Marlins. They are located in Jacksonville, Florida, and are named for shrimp caught in the area. The team plays their home games at 121 Financial Ballpark, which opened in 2003. They previously played at Sam W. Wolfson Baseball Park from 1962 until the end of the 2002 season. 

A team known as the Jacksonville Suns competed in the Triple-A International League from 1962 to 1968. The franchise was relocated to Norfolk, Virginia, as the Tidewater Tides in 1969. After one season without professional baseball, a different Suns team came to the city in 1970 as members of the Double-A Southern League (SL). From 1985 to 1990, the team was known as the Jacksonville Expos during an affiliation with the Montreal Expos, but they returned to the Suns moniker in 1991. The club rebranded as the Jacksonville Jumbo Shrimp before the 2017 season. In conjunction with Major League Baseball's reorganization of Minor League Baseball in 2021, the Jumbo Shrimp were elevated to the Triple-A East, which was renamed the International League in 2022.

Jacksonville won their only IL championship in 1968 as the Triple-A affiliate of the New York Mets. They won the SL championship six times. The first came in 1996 as the Double-A affiliate of the Detroit Tigers. As a farm club for the Los Angeles Dodgers, they won in  2001 and 2005. Three SL titles were won as the Double-A affiliate of the Miami Marlins, including back-to-back championships in 2009 and 2010 and most recently in 2014.

History
Jacksonville, Florida, has hosted professional baseball teams since the late 19th century. Six teams of the Southern League of Colored Base Ballists were based in the city in 1886. An unnamed team played in an early iteration of the Florida State League in 1892. With only a few interruptions from 1904 to 1961, the city was home to such Minor League Baseball teams as the Jays, Tars, and Braves, which played predominantly in the original South Atlantic League ("Sally League"), a predecessor to the modern Southern League. Jacksonville was also home to the Red Caps of the Negro leagues.

International League (1962–1968)
The first team from the Sunshine State of Florida known as the Jacksonville Suns arrived in the city by way of Havana, Cuba, and Jersey City, New Jersey. Following the Cuban Revolution in 1959, the Havana Sugar Kings of the Triple-A International League (IL) relocated to become the Jersey City Jerseys during the 1960 season. The franchise folded after the 1961 campaign and was bought by a local group headed by Samuel W. Wolfson, previously the owner of the Jacksonville Braves. The Suns played their home games at Jacksonville Baseball Park, which was renamed Sam W. Wolfson Baseball Park after Wolfson's death in 1963.

As the Triple-A affiliate of the Cleveland Indians, the Suns ended their first season by winning the 1962 International League pennant with a league-best 94–60 record under manager Ben Geraghty. In the Governors' Cup playoffs for the IL championship, they won the semifinals over the Rochester Red Wings but lost the finals to the Atlanta Crackers, 4–3. Shortstop/second baseman Tony Martínez was selected for the IL Most Valuable Player (MVP) Award, and right-hander Joe Schaffernoth won the Most Valuable Pitcher Award.

In 1964, Jacksonville became the top farm club of the St. Louis Cardinals. The team won a second IL pennant that year under manager Harry Walker with an 89–62 season, but they were eliminated in the postseason semifinals by Rochester. Shortstop Joe Morgan was selected as the 1964 league MVP. The Suns switched affiliations to the New York Mets in 1966.  During this period, pitchers Tom Seaver (1966) and Nolan Ryan (1967), both future Baseball Hall of Fame inductees, played for the Suns. Skipper Clyde McCullough led the 1968 Suns to win their only IL playoff championship. After defeating the Toledo Mud Hens, 3–1, in the semifinals, they won the league crown over the Columbus Jets, 4–0, in the finals.

When the Milwaukee Braves moved to Atlanta in 1966, the Atlanta Crackers relocated to Richmond, Virginia. This left Jacksonville as the southernmost team in the league, far away from the nearest clubs in Richmond and Louisville, Kentucky. After the 1968 season, the team was relocated to Norfolk, Virginia, as the Tidewater Tides. Jacksonville went without a minor league team in 1969.

Southern League (1970–2020)

A new Suns team began play in 1970 when the Double-A Southern League (SL) added expansion franchises in Jacksonville, and Mobile, Alabama. Jacksonville became the Double-A affiliate of both the Milwaukee Brewers and Montreal Expos for their first Southern League season. They became a Cleveland Indians farm club in 1971, and then began a much longer affiliation with the Kansas City Royals in 1972.

The Suns made their first Southern League playoff appearance in 1973 behind Manager of the Year Billy Gardner. They won the Eastern Division title but lost the championship finals versus the Montgomery Rebels, 3–1. Jacksonville returned to the playoffs in 1974 via another Eastern Division title but were again denied a championship by the Knoxville Sox, 3–2. By 1977, the SL had begun using a split-season schedule wherein the division winners from each half qualified for the postseason. The Suns won 1977's Second Half Eastern Division title, won the division title over the Savannah Braves, but lost to Montgomery, 2–0, in the finals. Jacksonville made two more appearances in the playoffs with Kansas City but lost in the finals each time. The 1982 team won both halves of the season with a league-best 83–61 record under Manager of the Year Gene Lamont, but they ultimately lost the championship to the Nashville Sounds, 3–1. The 1983 second-half champion Suns lost in the finals, 3–1, to the Birmingham Barons. Outfielder John Morris was selected as the 1983 Southern League MVP.

Jacksonville became the Double-A affiliate of the Montreal Expos in 1984. After being purchased by Peter Bragan Sr. and his family in 1985, the team was renamed the Jacksonville Expos. Much like in the previous affiliation, the Expos made four playoff appearances in seven seasons with Montreal but were eliminated in the Eastern Division series on each occasion (1986, 1987, 1988, and 1990). Individual players and managers, however, garnered several league awards during this period. First baseman Andrés Galarraga was the 1984 Southern League MVP, and skipper Rick Renick was the season's Manager of the Year. Tommy Thompson was recognized as the top manager for 1987 after leading the Expos to a league-best 85–59 record. Starting pitcher Brian Holman won the 1987 Most Outstanding Pitcher Award. Two other notable players to appear for Jacksonville in 1987 were future National League MVP Larry Walker and future Hall of Famer Randy Johnson. In 1990, starter Brian Barnes was the Most Outstanding Pitcher, and Jerry Manuel was the Manager of the Year.

Upon switching affiliation to the Seattle Mariners in 1991, the team reverted to its Suns moniker. Over four seasons with Seattle, the Suns never qualified for the playoffs. Right-hander Jim Converse won the 1992 Most Outstanding Pitcher Award after leading the Southern League with 157 strikeouts. Future major league All-Stars Alex Rodriguez (1994) and Bret Boone (1991) came through Jacksonville during the Mariners affiliation.

The Detroit Tigers became the parent club of the Suns in 1995. Behind the leadership of managers Bill Plummer and Larry Parrish, the 1996 Suns won both halves of the season and then the Eastern Division title over the Carolina Mudcats. They went on to defeat the Chattanooga Lookouts, 3–1, to win their first Southern League championship and first league title since 1968. The Detroit-affiliated Suns reached the championship finals twice more but lost to the Mobile BayBears in 1998 and West Tenn Diamond Jaxx in 2000. Outfielder Gabe Kapler won the 1998 MVP Award after leading the league in home runs (28), hits (176), runs (113), doubles (47), RBI (146), total bases (319, and sacrifice flies (11). Closer Francisco Cordero, the league's saves leader (27), was 1999's Most Outstanding Pitcher.

Jacksonville affiliated with the Los Angeles Dodgers in 2001. Manager of the Year John Shoemaker's 2001 club paced the league with an 83–56 mark, winning both halves of the season. They bested Chattanooga, 3–2, to advance to the finals against the Huntsville Stars, but the September 11 terrorist attacks brought a halt to the championship series before it began. Jacksonville and Huntsville were declared co-champions. The 2002 season was the Suns' last year at Wolfson Park. They moved into the newly constructed Baseball Grounds of Jacksonville, later renamed 121 Financial Ballpark, at the start of the 2003 season. The 11,000-seat, US$34-million venue was created as part of the Better Jacksonville Plan. The 2002 team made a bid to win the championship outright but was swept by Birmingham in the best-of-five finals. Starter Joel Hanrahan was 2003's Most Outstanding Pitcher. With Shoemaker still at the helm, the Suns won the first half title before sweeping Birmingham, 3–0, in the Southern Division series. They went on to win their third Southern League championship over West Tenn, 3–1. Though the 2006 club was eliminated by the Montgomery Biscuits in the division series, Shoemaker won his second Manager of the Year Award, and Spike Lundberg was selected as the league's Most Outstanding Pitcher.

Jacksonville entered into a new affiliation with the Florida Marlins in 2009; the MLB team became the Miami Marlins in 2012. The relationship got off to an auspicious start as the Suns won back-to-back Southern League championships. Brandon Hyde's 2009 second-half winners swept Birmingham for the Southern Division title then defeated the Tennessee Smokies, 3–1, in the finals for the championship win. Tim Leiper took over managerial duties for the 2010 season. After winning both halves of the season with an 81–59 record, Jacksonville bested Mobile, 3–1, in the division series before knocking off Tennessee, 3–1, for the second-straight year in the championship round. Tom Koehler won that season's Most Outstanding Pitcher Award. In 2014, the Suns finished the regular season on a ten-game winning streak, edging out the Mississippi Braves by one game to win the second half title. Including the playoffs, the Suns won 16 of their final 17 games en route to winning the Southern Division title over Mobile and their sixth and final Southern League championship over Chattanooga, 3–0. Justin Nicolino was recognized as the league's Most Outstanding Pitcher.

The Bragan family sold the franchise to Ken Babby of Fast Forward Sports Group in 2015. The Suns rebranded after the 2016 season, becoming the Jacksonville Jumbo Shrimp. The name combines shrimping, which is popular on Jacksonville's St. Johns River, with the sentiment that Jacksonville, Florida's largest city, still has a small-town feel, hinting at the moniker's oxymoronic nature. The 2017 team won a second half title, but they lost the Southern Division to the Pensacola Blue Wahoos. The start of the 2020 season was postponed due to the COVID-19 pandemic before being cancelled on June 30.

Triple-A East / International League (2021–present)

Since the move to 121 Financial Ballpark, the Suns have consistently been at or near the top of their league in attendance. This success led to speculation that the team could return to the Triple-A level in the future. In conjunction with Major League Baseball's reorganization of the minor leagues after the 2020 season, the Jumbo Shrimp were selected to move up to the Triple-A classification—making them the only active Florida-based team at that level—and continue as affiliates of the Miami Marlins in 2021. They were placed in the 20-team Triple-A East. Jacksonville began competition in the new league on May 4 with an 11–5 victory over the Norfolk Tides at 121 Financial Ballpark. They ended the season in second place in the Southeastern Division with a 69–51 record. No playoffs were held to determine a league champion; instead, the team with the best regular-season record was declared the winner. However, 10 games that had been postponed from the start of the season were reinserted into the schedule as a postseason tournament called the Triple-A Final Stretch in which all 30 Triple-A clubs competed for the highest winning percentage. Jacksonville finished the tournament tied for seventh place with a 6–4 record. In 2022, the Triple-A East became known as the International League, the name historically used by the regional circuit prior to the 2021 reorganization.

Season-by-season records

Radio and television
Scott Kornberg has been the play-by-play announcer for Jumbo Shrimp games since 2020. Live audio broadcasts are available online through the team's website, on WOKV 690 AM, and the MiLB First Pitch app. Games can be viewed through the MiLB.TV subscription feature of the official website of Minor League Baseball, with audio provided by a radio simulcast.

Roster

Awards 

Fourteen players, six managers, and six executives have won league awards in recognition for their performance with Jacksonville.

Notes

See also 
Jacksonville Jumbo Shrimp players (2017–present)
Jacksonville Suns players (1962–1968, 1970–1984, 1991–2016)
Jacksonville Expos players (1985–1990)

References

External links

 
 Statistics from Baseball-Reference

1962 establishments in Florida
Baseball in Jacksonville, Florida
Baseball teams established in 1962
Cleveland Guardians minor league affiliates
Detroit Tigers minor league affiliates
International League teams
Southern League (1964–present) teams
Kansas City Royals minor league affiliates
Los Angeles Dodgers minor league affiliates
Miami Marlins minor league affiliates
Montreal Expos minor league affiliates
New York Mets minor league affiliates
Professional baseball teams in Florida
Seattle Mariners minor league affiliates
St. Louis Cardinals minor league affiliates
Triple-A East teams